Lautrec is a commune in the Tarn department in southern France.

Demography

Remarkable sites
Lautrec is listed among "The Most Beautiful Villages of France" as well as a "Remarkable Site for Taste" thanks to its renowned pink garlic. Its remarkable sites include:

 the village itself, with its 14th century market square
 the Saint Remy collegiate church and its sumptuous marble retable
 the 17th century windmill, one of the few still working today in the South of France
 a clog workshop, recreated after the one that existed there until the early 1960s
 the Caussade Gate (13th century)
 the Salette calvary (altitude 328 m)
 the Roman road

See also

 Famous painter Henri de Toulouse-Lautrec’s family had roots in this village
 Communes of the Tarn department
 Tourism in Tarn

References

Communes of Tarn (department)
Plus Beaux Villages de France